Nandeshwar is a village in Belgaum district of Karnataka, India.

References

Villages in Belagavi district